Naughty but Mice is a 1939 Warner Bros. Merrie Melodies cartoon directed by Chuck Jones. The short was released on May 20, 1939, and stars Sniffles in his cartoon debut.

It is the only Sniffles cartoon not to be reissued, and therefore survives with its original titles.

Plot
Sniffles is shown walking down a street carrying a piece of paper. He seems to show most of the obvious symptoms of the common cold and this is proven when, after looking at the name of the drug store he is standing outside, he looks at the paper in his hands, which is ripped, but gives details what to do about the cold virus. Satisfied that he is outside the right store, Sniffles creeps in through the letter box in the door and finds himself inside the drug store. He looks around and eventually spots the cold and flu remedies and makes his way to the shelf.

He finds a bottle that claims to be a cold remedy but also has (in small writing at the bottom of the label.) the moniker "Alcohol 125% proof", which he misses as he only reads the top of the label. He opens the bottle, pours some of the mixture into a spoon and drinks it. Now getting slightly tipsy, Sniffles makes his way along the shelf and bumps into a box containing an electric razor. The razor comes out of its box and - using a buzzing noise, which can still be understood by the audience (with some difficulty) - the razor greets Sniffles. Sniffles advises the razor that he (Sniffles) has a cold, before promptly sneezing on him. Moments later, the razor also begins to show symptoms of the common cold.

Sniffles informs the razor that he (the razor) has caught his cold and promises to get a cold remedy. After telling the razor several times not to move anywhere he leaves and comes back with the spoon filled with (presumably) the same cold remedy he had taken some minutes before. Now both Sniffles and the razor are feeling drunk and partake in a rendition of How Dry I Am. The razor then seems to get tired and Sniffles walks away. As he does so, a heretofore hidden black cat begins to follow him.

Sniffles finds a claw vending machine and makes his way inside as something has grabbed his attention. The cat finds coins in a pocket (or at least somewhere in its fur) and tries to grab Sniffles. Eventually he succeeds and Sniffles, who had been oblivious to the existence of the cat, begins to get very scared. The razor wakes up and begins to attack the cat, shaving off the cats fur. The cat runs away. Sniffles thanks the razor, sneezes again and is blown backwards, and into the claw of the vending machine. The cartoon ends with Sniffles smiling, hanging from the claw by his trousers.

See also
Herman and Katnip (Paramount Pictures cartoon)

References

Bibliography
Sandler, Kevin S. Reading the rabbit: explorations in Warner Bros. animation, Rutgers University Press, 1998, 
Grant, John Masters of animation, Watson-Guptill Publications, 2001,

External links

Warner Bros. Animation animated films
Merrie Melodies short films
Short films directed by Chuck Jones
1939 animated films
1939 films
Animated films about animals
Animated films about mice
Films scored by Carl Stalling
1930s Warner Bros. animated short films